Greg Restall (born 11 January 1969) is an Australian philosopher and Professor of Philosophy at the University of St Andrews.
He is a fellow of the Australian Academy of the Humanities. 
Restall is known for his research on logic and theories of meaning.
After working at the University of Melbourne for years he was appointed the Shelby Cullom David Professor of Philosophy at the University of St Andrews.

Books
 An Introduction to Substructural Logics, Routledge, 2000
 Logic, Routledge, 2006
 Logical Pluralism, with Jc Beall, Oxford University Press, 2006

See also
Substructural logic
Validity (logic)
Logical harmony
Relevance logic

References

External links
Personal Website
 Greg Restall at the University of Melbourne
https://www.st-andrews.ac.uk/philosophy/news/title-114634-en.php

Australian philosophers
Analytic philosophers
Christian philosophers
Philosophy academics
Living people
Academic staff of the University of Melbourne
University of Queensland alumni
1969 births
Philosophers of language
Australian logicians
Philosophers of logic
Academic staff of Macquarie University
Academic staff of the Australian National University